Scarlet Plume is a novel by Frederick Manfred, the fourth in The Buckskin Man Tales.  The Dakota War of 1862 is shown from the point of view of a woman captured by the Sioux at the beginning of the war. The novel presents the Yankton Sioux from a stylized and sympathetic perspective; although the cultural, anthropological, and historical details are accurate, the story itself is a romance in the technical sense that the word applies to Hawthorne.

References
"Frederick Manfred." Dictionary of Literary Biography 212:185-197. 1999.
The Frederick Manfred Information Page

Western (genre) novels
Dakota War of 1862
Novels set in Minnesota
Books about Native Americans
Novels set in the 1860s
Fiction set in 1862
1964 American novels